The Foolish Matrons is a 1921 American silent drama film directed by Clarence Brown and Maurice Tourneur and starring Hobart Bosworth, Doris May, and Mildred Manning. It is also known by the alternative title of Is Marriage a Failure?.

Preserved in the George Eastman House collection.

Cast
 Hobart Bosworth as Dr. Ian Fraser  
 Doris May as Georgia Wayne  
 Mildred Manning as Sheila Hopkins  
 Kathleen Kirkham as Annis Grand  
 Betty Schade as The Mysterious Woman  
 Margaret McWade as Mrs. Eugenia Sheridan  
 Charles Meredith as Lafayette Wayne  
 Wallace MacDonald as Anthony Sheridan  
 Michael Dark as Chester King  
 Frankie Lee as Bobby
 Dick Sutherland as Bit Role

References

Bibliography
 Waldman, Harry. Maurice Tourneur: The Life and Films. McFarland, 2001.

External links

1921 films
1921 drama films
Silent American drama films
Films directed by Maurice Tourneur
American silent feature films
1920s English-language films
American black-and-white films
1920s American films